Samir Mouqbel (born 1939) is a Lebanese politician. He was the deputy prime minister and defense minister of Lebanon.

Early life and education
Mouqbel was born in 1939. He graduated from the American University of Beirut with a degree in civil engineering.

Career
Mouqbel is a Greek Orthodox Christian Independent, and was Lebanon's first state minister responsible for environment from 1992 to 1995 in the first cabinet of Rafic Hariri. He was appointed deputy to the prime minister Najib Mikati on 13 June 2011. He was reappointed deputy prime minister in the cabinet led by Tammam Salam in February 2013. He was also appointed defense minister, replacing Fayez Ghosn in the post.

References

Living people
American University of Beirut alumni
Greek Orthodox Christians from Lebanon
Eastern Orthodox Christians from Lebanon
Lebanese civil engineers
1939 births
Deputy prime ministers of Lebanon
Defense ministers of Lebanon
Independent politicians in Lebanon